Ulrike Theusner( born 1982 in Frankfurt (Oder), Germany) is a German artist working primarily in drawing and printmaking. She studied at École Nationale Supérieure d'Arts à la Villa Arson in Nice, France and graduated in 2008 from Bauhaus University in Weimar, Germany. Amongst others, her work was exhibited in groupshows at Kunsthalle Darmstadt, Musée des Beaux-Arts de Nice, Neues Museum Weimar and several solo shows in New York, Berlin, Frankfurt, Toulouse, Paris and Shanghai. She lives and works between Weimar and Berlin.

Works

Solo exhibitions
 2018 Ulrike Theusner. painting and graphic, Kunsthalle Harry Graf Kessler, Weimar(D), to visit from Sept. 29 to Nov. 11, 2018
 2018 SWEET BIRD OF YOUTH, Galerie Sabine Knust , Munich (D), July 5 to September 8, 2018
 2017 ENDSPIEL, Galerie Bunker-D, in Kiel, Germany
 2017 THE BEST OF ALL POSSIBLE WORLDS, ACC Weimar, Germany

The « Best of all possible worlds » – Leibniz formula published in 1710 is Ulrike Theusner starting point for a reflection on our living conditions and our living together. What are we missing in the best of all possible worlds? Can we live without utopias - political, social, economic or environmental? What about our self-image in the best of all possible worlds?
 2016 THE GASPING SOCIETY, Anger Museum, Leipzig, Germany
 2016 Ulrike Theusner - A Rake Progress,, Neue Sächsische Galerie, Chemnitz, Allemagne

The exhibition is part of the commemoration of the revolutions of February and September 1917 in Russia. It includes works by the following artists: 
The Blue Noses, Carlfriedrich Claus, Fritz Duda, Alwin Eckert, Erich Enge, Hubertus Giebe, Moritz Götze, Wasja Götze, Norbert Hinterberger, Via Lewandowsky, Martin Maleschka, Florian Merkel, Olaf Nicolai, Haralampi G. Oroschakoff, Osmar Osten, A.R.Penck, Uwe Pfeifer, Ulrich Polster, Julian Röder, Ulrike Theusner, TMOMMA, Sergej Voronzow, Norbert Wagenbrett, Brigitte Waldach, Willy Wolff, Axel Wunsch, Silvio Zesch, ZIP

 2017 The Promised Land, Ulrike Theusner and Jazz-Minh Moore, Galerie Rothamel Erfurt, Germany

Ulrike Theusner and Jazz-Minh Moore met in 2010 in New York. They founded the collective "GutBox" and presented under this label several exhibitions in the United States. "Promised Land" is their first cooperation in Europe. 
Like "The Gasping Society" - another series of Ulrike Theusner presented in parallel at the Anger museum in Erfurt (Germany), "The Promised Land" focuses on the loss of benchmarks, the drift of justice towards self-righteousness and to the perdition of people in a complex system. 
Jazz-Minh Moore says, «This body of work begins with a series of paintings juxtaposing an abandoned American diner with the new multi-billion-dollar «Biospheres» currently under construction in Seattle. The America of our grandparents’ generation is being abandoned for new, high-tech or exotic options. Many people have been left behind. This is not new news, but it has become magnified with our recent (2017) election. »

 2015 Alterity, The Lodge Gallery New York
 2015 Printmaking Symposium, Tapetenwerk Leipzig
 2014 Des Grands Yeux Morts, Galerie Dukan Leipzig
 2014 Les Fleurs du Mal, The Lodge Gallery New York
 2014 Hotspot, Treize Paris
 2014 Fremde, Bauhaus Museum, Haus am Horn Weimar
 2013 Le jardin souterrain, Station Saint-Germain-des-Prés, Paris
 2012 The Double Dirty Dozen, Freight&Volume, New York
 2012 Stippvisite, Neues Museum Weimar
 2011 Gratwanderung, Bauhaus Museum Weimar
 2011 IMPULSE, Aando Fine Arts Berlin
 2011 Almost transparent blue, Y Gallery, New York
 2010 Koschatzky Kunstpreis, MUMOK, Albertina Vienna
 2010 Chroma, Bauhaus Universität Weimar
 2010 First Exhibition, EKE Studio, Brooklyn, New York
 2010 European Contemporary Print Triennial 2010, Toulouse
 2009 Visite, Kunstverein Speyer
 2009 Traits Noir, Musée des Beaux Arts Nizza
 2007 UMAM, Nouvelle Biennale , Union mediterranéenne pour l´art moderne , Nice
 2006 Ne pas toucher le contur, Galerie d´essai, Villa Arson , Nice

Awards 
 2019 selected for the sponsorship programme of „NEW POSITIONS“  at ART COLOGNE 2019
Rose-Maria Gropp reports in the Kunstmarkt pages of the Frankfurter Allgemeine Zeitung (F.A.Z.) of April 12, 2019: ... "New Position" at the Eigen + Art gallery: Ulrike Theusner paints soul out of the body, with pastel bright colors on paper (from 1,200 euros); the entire booth was sold during the first hours of preview.
 2013 IGG Graphic Award
 2011 Work Fellowship Bildende Kunst „Art Regio“
 2010 1. Price of European Contemporary Print Triennial Toulouse

Publications 
 2017 THE BEST OF ALL POSSIBLE WORLDS, 21x21cm, 35 pages, JALARA Publishing
 2016 Gasping society, 21x21cm, 62 pages, JALARA Publishing 
 2015 Limbo Express, 21x21cm, 32 pages, JALARA Publishing 
 2015 New York Diaries I, 21x21cm, 30 pages, JALARA Publishing 
 2013 A Rake´s Progress, 21x21cm, 28 pages, JALARA Publishing 
 2013 New York Diaries III, 
 2012 Der Abgesang, Ulrike Bestgen, ©2012 Galerie Rothamel
 2011 Weird Feelings, Kai Uwe Schierz and Ulrike Theusner, ©2011 Galerie Rothamel.
 2010 Ten Seconds of Fame, Thomas Lenhart
 2008 The Waste Land, Diplomarbeit Bauhaus Universität Weimar

References

External links
artist website www.ulrike theusner.de
gallery website www.eigen-art.com
Artbroth.com
 Artfacts.net

1982 births
Living people
Artists from Berlin
German contemporary artists
21st-century German women artists
21st-century German artists
People from Frankfurt (Oder)